Francisco de Osona, also Francisco de Osona the Younger, (c.1465–c.1514) was a Spanish Renaissance painter.

Francisco was born in Valencia. There has been some confusion between Francisco and his father Rodrigo de Osona. Father and son worked closely together in their workshop in Valencia, therefore works are often attributed to both, although some assumptions are made that Francisco was more open to what was newer styles and forms in Italy. However, while the activity of Rodrigo ended with his death in 1518, Francisco died before him much younger in 1514. The second table of the Epiphany, preserved in London, is signed by "The teacher's son Rodrigo", in which, on the contrary, there seems to have more traditional trend seen in the works of the father. Francisco has been credited with Christ before Pilate in the Museu de Belles Arts de València, as well as The Adoration of the Magi in the Victoria and Albert Museum. The work of two Osona artists, along with Paolo de San Leocadio, form the basis for Spanish classicism in painting.

References
 Tramoyeres Blasco, Luis, "The Valencian Quattrocento, Osona Maestro Rodrigo and his son of the same name," Spanish Culture, No. 9 (February 1908), p. 139–156, Madrid, 1908.
 TORMO Y MONZÓ, E., "Rodrigo de Osona, father and son, and his school (I)," Spanish Archives of Art and Archaeology, t.8, No.23 (May–August 1932), págs.101-147, Madrid, 1932.
 TORMO Y MONZÓ, E., "Rodrigo de Osona, father and son, and his school (II)", Spanish Archive of Art and Archaeology, t.9, No. 27 (September–December 1933), págs.153-210, Madrid, 1933. 

1465 births
1514 deaths
15th-century Spanish painters
Spanish male painters
16th-century Spanish painters
People from Valencia
Spanish Renaissance painters
Painters from the Valencian Community